Nietzschean affirmation is a concept in the philosophy of Friedrich Nietzsche. The best example of this concept can be found in Nietzsche's The Will to Power:

Opposition to Schopenhauer
Walter Kaufmann wrote that Nietzsche "celebrates the Greeks who, facing up to the terrors of nature and history, did not seek refuge in "a Buddhistic negation of the will," as Schopenhauer did, but instead created tragedies in which life is affirmed as beautiful in spite of everything." Schopenhauer’s negation of the will was a saying "no" to life and to the world, which he judged to be a scene of pain and evil. "[D]irectly against Schopenhauer’s place as the ultimate nay-sayer to life, Nietzsche positioned himself as the ultimate yes-sayer…." Nietzsche's affirmation of life's pain and evil, in opposition to Schopenhauer, resulted from an overflow of life. Schopenhauer's advocacy of self-denial and negation of life was, according to Nietzsche, very harmful. For his entire mature life, Nietzsche was concerned with the damage that he thought resulted from Schopenhauerian disgust with life and turning against the world.

Derridean interpretation
Jacques Derrida appropriates this concept and applies it specifically to language, its structure and play. This application acknowledges that there is, in fact, no center or origin within language and its many parts, no firm ground from which to base any Truth or truths. This shock allows for two reactions in Derrida's philosophy: the more negative, melancholic response, which he designates as Rousseauistic, or the more positive Nietzschean affirmation. Rousseau's perspective focuses on deciphering the truth and origin of language and its many signs, an often exhaustive occupation. Derrida's response to Nietzsche, however, offers an active participation with these signs and arrives at, in Derridean philosophy, a more resolute response to language.

In "Structure, Sign, and Play", Derrida articulates Nietzsche's perspective as:
... the joyous affirmation of the play of the world and of the innocence of becoming, the affirmation of a world of signs without fault, without truth, and without origin which is offered to an active interpretation.

Essentially, Derrida not only fosters Nietzsche's work but evolves it within the sphere of language; in doing so, Derrida acquires and employs Nietzsche's optimism in his concept of play: "the substitution of given and existing, present, pieces" (292). Much of this spirit resides in the abandonment of any sort of new humanism. This acceptance of the inevitable allows for considerable reliefevident in the designation of the loss of center as a non-centeras well as the opportunity to affirm and cultivate play, which enables humanity and the humanities "to pass beyond man and humanism" (292).

See also
Amor fati
Everlasting Yea

References

Philosophy of Friedrich Nietzsche
Jacques Derrida
 Category:Philosophy of life